Scotorythra apicalis is a moth of the family Geometridae. It was first described by Otto Herman Swezey in 1948. It is endemic to the island of Hawaii.

External links

apicalis
Endemic moths of Hawaii